Rubidium ozonide is an oxygen rich compound of rubidium. It is an ozonide, meaning it contains the ozonide anion (O3−).

It can be created by reacting rubidium superoxide (RbO2) with ozone (O3) in a liquid ammonia solution.

RbO2 + O3 -> RbO3 + O2

The chemical forms in two crystal structures, the low temperature α-RbO3 (P21), and β-RbO3 (P21/c) Detailed structural analysis finds the ozonide anions are significantly off-center from the surrounding rubidium atoms.

Since ozonide anion is magnetic, electron paramagnetic resonance measurements of rubidium ozonide have determined the  g-values of the ozonide anion.

References

Rubidium compounds
Ozonides